The 1998 Villanova Wildcats football team was an American football team that represented the Villanova University as a member of the Atlantic 10 Conference during the 1998 NCAA Division I-AA football season. In their 14th year under head coach Andy Talley, the team compiled a 6–5 record.

Schedule

References

Villanova
Villanova Wildcats football seasons
Villanova Wildcats football